The table below lists the judgments of the Constitutional Court of South Africa delivered in 2002.

The members of the court at the start of 2002 were Chief Justice Arthur Chaskalson, Deputy Chief Justice Pius Langa, and judges Lourens Ackermann, Richard Goldstone, Johann Kriegler, Tholie Madala, Yvonne Mokgoro, Sandile Ngcobo, Kate O'Regan, Albie Sachs and Zak Yacoob. Justice Kriegler retired in November and Dikgang Moseneke was appointed in his place.

References
 
 

2002
Constitutional Court
Constitutional Court of South Africa